The Lao-American College FC Stadium or NUOLs Stadium is a Football Ground in Vientiane, Laos. It is used as the home stadium of Lao-American College FC in the Lao League. The Lao-American College FC Stadium holds 1,500 spectators.

Football venues in Laos
Buildings and structures in Vientiane